The Lokomotiv Central Stadium is a multi-purpose stadium in Nizhny Novgorod, Russia.  It is currently used mostly for football matches and was the home ground of Olimpiyets Nizhny Novgorod. The stadium holds 17,856 people and was opened in 1932. It underwent its most recent reconstruction in 1997. It should not be confused with the Lokomotiv Central Stadium in Moscow, the home of Lokomotiv Moscow.

Presently, it is the home arena of Olimpiyets Nizhny Novgorod.

References

Football venues in Russia
Sport in Nizhny Novgorod
FC Lokomotiv Nizhny Novgorod
Multi-purpose stadiums in Russia
FC Volga Nizhny Novgorod
Buildings and structures in Nizhny Novgorod
Cultural heritage monuments in Nizhny Novgorod Oblast